is a Japanese football player. He played for Japan national team.

Club career
Motoyama was born in Kitakyushu on June 20, 1979. After graduating from high school, he joined J1 League club Kashima Antlers in 1998. He debuted in July 1998 and he played many matches from 1999 season. In 2000, Antlers won the champions all three major title in Japan; J1 League, J.League Cup and Emperor's Cup first time in J1 League history. The club also won the champions 2001 J1 League for 2 years in a row. In 2002, he was given the number "10" shirt as Bismarck successor. Antlers also won the champions in 2002 J.League Cup.

In 2007 season, he played all 34 matches and Antlers won the champions in J1 League for the first time in 6 years. Antlers also won the champions in 2007 Emperor's Cup. Antlers won the champions in J1 League for 3 years in a row (2007-2009).

From 2010 season, although his opportunity to play decreased, Antlers won the champions 2010 Emperor's Cup, 2011 and 2012 J.League Cup. In 2015, he could only play 6 matches and he left the club end of 2015 season.

In 2016, Motoyama moved to his local club Giravanz Kitakyushu in J2 League. He played many matches in 2016 season. However Giravanz was finished at the bottom place of 22 clubs and was relegated to J3 League. From 2017 season, he could not play many matches for injuries. At the end of 2019 season, he opted to retire after not appearing at all for Giravanz that year.

Motoyama came out of retirement when it was announced at the end of 2020 that he would play for Malaysia Premier League team Kelantan United F.C., making this his first team outside of Japan.

International career
In April 1999, Motoyama was selected Japan U-20 national team for 1999 World Youth Championship. At this tournament, he played all 7 matches as left side midfielder and Japan won the 2nd place.

On June 18, 2000, Motoyama debuted for Japan national team under manager Philippe Troussier against Bolivia.

In September 2000, Motoyama was selected Japan U-23 national team for 2000 Summer Olympics. He played 3 matches as substitute midfielder.

In September 2003, Motoyama played for Japan under manager Zico for the first time in 3 years. After that, he played many matches as substitute. In 2004, he was selected Japan for 2004 Asian Cup. He played 4 matches and Japan won the champions. He was also member of Japan for 2005 Confederations Cup. He played 28 games for Japan until 2006.

Career statistics

Club
Update; 1 January 2020.

International

Appearances in major competitions

Honours
Kashima Anthers
 J1 League - 1998, 2000, 2001, 2007, 2008, 2009
 Emperor's Cup - 2000, 2007
 J.League Cup - 2000, 2002
 Japanese Super Cup - 2009

Japan
 FIFA World Youth Championship - 1999 (Runner-up)
 AFC Asian Cup - 2004

Individual
 AFC U-19 Championship Top Scorer - 1998
 FIFA World Youth Championship Best Eleven - 1999

References

External links

Japan National Football Team Database

Profile at Giravanz Kitakyushu

1979 births
Living people
Association football people from Fukuoka Prefecture
Japanese footballers
Japan youth international footballers
Japan international footballers
J1 League players
J2 League players
J3 League players
Kashima Antlers players
Giravanz Kitakyushu players
Olympic footballers of Japan
Footballers at the 2000 Summer Olympics
2004 AFC Asian Cup players
2005 FIFA Confederations Cup players
AFC Asian Cup-winning players
Association football midfielders
Kelantan United F.C. players